This is a list of assets owned by Mars, Incorporated.

Mars Edge 
Mars Edge is primarily food nutrition research and development.

 CocoaVia

Mars Food 
Mars Food is primarily food manufacturing and brands.

 Abu Siouf
 Ben's Original
 Dolmio
 Ebly
 Kan Tong
 KIND
 MasterFoods
 Miracoli
 OXO (only in South Africa)
 Pamesello
 Ráris
 Royco
 Seeds of Change
 Suzi Wan
 Tasty Bite

Mars Petcare 
Mars Petcare is primarily pet food manufacturing and brands as well as pet healthcare services, technologies, and brands.

Mars Veterinary Health 
Mars Veterinary Health is composed of pet healthcare services and provider networks.

Mars Veterinary Health North America 
 Banfield Pet Hospital
 BluePearl Specialty and Emergency Pet Hospital
 VCA Animal Hospitals

Mars Veterinary Health International and Diagnostics 
 AniCura
 Antech Diagnostic / Sound
 Asia Veterinary Diagnostics
 Linnaeus Veterinary Group
 Mount Pleasant Veterinary Group
 Veterinary Emergency & Specialty (VES) Hospital Singapore
 Veterinary Specialty Hospital of Hong Kong (VSH Hong Kong)

Pet food and supplies 

 ADVANCE (Australia and New Zealand only)
 API
 Aquarian
 Aquariam Pharmaceuticals
 Buckeye Nutrition
 Catisfactions
 Cesar Canine Cuisine
 Chappi
 Crave
 Dreamies
 Dine
 Exelcat
 Eukanuba (except in Europe)
 Exelpet
 Frolic
 The Goodlife Recipe
 Good-o
 Greenies
 Iams (except in Europe)
 James Wellbeloved
 Kit-e-Kat
 Max
 My Dog
 Natura
 Nutro Products
 Pedigree
 Optimum
 Pill Pockets
 PrettyLitter
 Royal Canin
 Schmackos
 Sheba
 Spillers
 Teasers
 Techni-Cal
 Temptations
 Trill
 Ultra
 Whiskas
 Winergy

Pet technology and investments 

 Waltham Petcare Science Institute

Companion Fund 
The Companion Fund is an over $100 million investment fund that focuses on pet technology and pet care.

Through this fund, Mars has invested in:

 Companion
 Made by Nacho
 Mollybox
 Native Pet
 Pawp
 PetMedix
 Rejuvenate Bio
 RiverDog
 ScoutBio
 Scratchpay
 Smalls
 Tailwise

Kinship 
Kinship is an investment entity that focuses on pet technology and pet care.

Through this fund, Mars has invested in:
 FluffyGo
 Leap Venture Studio & Academy
 Pet Insight Project
 Pet Story
 VetInSight
 Whistle
 Wisdom Panel

Mars Wrigley 
Mars Wrigley is primarily chocolate, chewing gum, snacks, and confections manufacturing and brands.

Mars 

 3 Musketeers
 Amicelli
 American Heritage Chocolate
 Balisto
 Bounty
 Celebrations
 Cirku
 CocoaVia
 Combos
 Dove
 Dove Bar
 Ethel M Chocolates
 FLAVIA
 Fling
 Flyte
 Forever Yours
 Galaxy
 Galaxy Bubbles
 Galaxy Honeycomb Crisp
 Galaxy Minstrels
 goodnessKNOWS
 Kudos
 M-Azing
 M&M's
 M&M's World
 Maltesers
 Marathon
 Mars
 Milky Way
 Munch
 My M&M's
 Promite
 Revels
 Seeds of Change
 Snickers
 Topic
 Tracker
 Treets
 Chocolates Turín (Mexico)
 Twix

The Wrigley Company 

 5 (gum)
 A. Korkunov
 Airwaves
 Alert
 Alpine
 Altoids
 Big Red
 Bubble Tape
 Callard & Bowser-Suchard
 Doublemint
 Eclipse
 Eclipse Ice
 Excel
 Extra
 Freedent
 Hubba Bubba
 Juicy Fruit
 Life Savers
 Lockets
 Orbit
 Ouch!
 Skittles
 Starburst
 Sugus
 Surpass
 Rondo
 Tunes
 Wrigley's
 Wrigley's Spearmint
 Winterfresh

Discontinued product lines

 AquaDrops
 Banjo Candy Bar
 Bliss Candy Bar
 Bisc &
 Cookies &
 Corn Quistos
 Pacers
 PB Max
 Royals
 Spangles
 Summit Cookie Bars

Former brands
 Pet Partners (Now a part of VCA Animal Hospitals)
 Big League Chew (Acquired by Ford Gum)
 Flavia Beverage Systems (Acquired by Lavazza)
 KLIX

References

External links
 Mars, Incorporated website

Mars, Incorporated